Peter Vales  is a former Indian footballer and was the head coach of Salgaocar S.C. in the Indian I-League until 18 November 2012 when David Booth will take over as manager full-time.

Coaching career

Salgaocar: 2012
On 20 October 2012, it was officially announced that Salgaocar S.C. head coach Karim Bencherifa had resigned from his post and that Vales would become the interim coach until 18 November in which David Booth would take over as head coach. Vales coached his first professional Salgaocar game on 28 October 2012 against Pailan Arrows at the Fatorda Stadium in Margao, Goa in which the game ended 0–0. He then won his first match for the club on 3 November 2012 against Mumbai in which he coached Salgaocar to a 1–0 victory which was also the club's first victory of the season.

Statistics

Coach
Since 9 November 2012

References

Indian footballers
Living people
I-League managers
Indian football managers
Indian football coaches
Association footballers not categorized by position
Year of birth missing (living people)
Footballers from Goa